Cheshmeh-ye Mulid (also Romanized as Cheshmeh-ye Mūlīd; also known as Cheshmeh and Chashmeh) is a village in Alqurat Rural District, in the Central District of Birjand County, South Khorasan Province, Iran. At the 2006 census, its population was 27, in 10 families.

References 

Populated places in Birjand County